The Flying Dust First Nation ( kâ-ohpâwahkâstahk) is a Cree First Nation band government located adjacent to the city of Meadow Lake in Saskatchewan, Canada. Highway 55 goes through the band's reserve community.

Indian reserves
The band governs twelve reserves:
Flying Dust 105 - 
Flying Dust 105D - 
Flying Dust 105E - 
Flying Dust 105F - 
Flying Dust 105H - 
Flying Dust 105I - 
Flying Dust 105J - 
Flying Dust 105L - 
Flying Dust 105O - 
Gladue Lake 105B - 
Meadow Lake 105A - 
Meadow Lake 105C -

Demographics

Government
The Flying Dust First Nation is governed by a chief and four councillors. Flying Dust is a member of the Meadow Lake Tribal Council, whose offices are located on the reserve.

Community services and enterprises

With 1,529 members (592 living on-reserve and 937 living off-reserve) the community has developed a reputation as a progressive and strong community. Facilities on-reserve include the Kopahawakenum School (K-4), a health clinic, an elders building, an administration building, a bank, a community hall, a community church, a health office, a radio station, a youth centre, infrastructure/maintenance compound, daycare, a hockey arena, gas station and convenience store. The community hosted the 2003 Saskatchewan First Nations Summer Games, as well as their first annual Pow wow in 2005.

The Flying Dust First Nation has developed several business partnerships to increase its business portfolios to Property Development, Oil & Gas & Forestry. It also has a great economic stability. It manages a  Farming, Sand and Gravel Operation. Flying Dust is a treaty land entitlement band with the capability of purchasing 6,788 more acres of land. The Flying Dust has a long-standing partnership with the town of Meadow Lake and they have worked jointly on several major projects in the region over the last few decades.

References

First Nations governments in Saskatchewan